Topog Peak is a mountain in the West Humboldt Range of Churchill County, in Nevada, United States.

Summit panorama

References

Mountains of Churchill County, Nevada